Lene Camilla Westgaard-Halle (born 4 July 1979, Oslo) is a Norwegian political scientist from Drammen, and politician for the Conservative Party.

Early life and education
Westgaard-Halle grew up on Åskollen in Drammen. She was an active alpinist in Drammen Slalom Club for many years and is the daughter of national team alpinist Dag Lars Westgaard. She graduated from Hawera High School in New Zealand in 1997, and Drammen Gymnas in 1998. She studied political science at the University of Oslo and took subjects at the University of Oxford.

Career

Local politics
Westgaard-Halle became active in politics at the upper secondary school, and was a city council candidate for the first time in 1999. She led Drammen European Youth from 2001 to 2003, Buskerud Young Conservatives from 2002 to 2004 and the Moderate group in the Student Parliament at the University of Oslo from 2005 to 2007. She also sat in the leadership of the student parliament. She sat for 10 years as a representative in Drammen city council and as a member of the chairmanship and school committee, and in Buskerud county council where she was a member of the main committee for education and the county committee. She was for several years a member of Drammen Conservative's main board and the board of Buskerud Conservatives. Locally she has been a member of Drammen city council and Buskerud county council, as well as Larvik municipal council and Vestfold county council.

She has been a member of several Executive Boards, amongst them, the Executive Boards of Buskerud Hospital, and the Executive Board of the University of Oslo.

Parliament
She is a member of the Norwegian Parliament since 2017, representing Vestfold. She also represented Buskerud as deputy member from 2005 to 2009.

She has been promoting green technologies and policies, and «the green shift» in Norway. 

On 9 April 2021, marking 81 years since the German occupation of Norway, Westgaard-Halle supported minister of culture Abid Raja's criticism of Carl Bildt's claiming the Swedish defence forces were stronger than those of Norway and Denmark. She stated Sweden looked away and let "Hitler invade Norway", further stating that she hopes that "this is not the way Sweden remembers the most horrible day in Norwegian history". She was supported by Progress Party member of parliament Erlend Wiborg, who said that "I think Margaret Thatcher summarised your participation in the war pretty well".

In January 2022, she expressed criticism against the state broadcaster NRK after they listed fewer positions previously held by Vice Governor of the Norwegian Central Bank Ida Wolden Bache compared to NATO Secretary-General Jens Stoltenberg. She stated: “I think it would be journalistically correct to include what they have both done, not just one”. She went on to add: “But at least it looks strange all the time Wolden Bache has far more on her CV than what they choose to include”.

References

External links

Party bio
Lene Westgaard-Halle in Norwegian

1979 births
Living people
Deputy members of the Storting
Conservative Party (Norway) politicians
Buskerud politicians
Politicians from Drammen
University of Oslo alumni
Women members of the Storting